Adesmia aconcaguensis is an endemic perennial herb found in Argentina.

References

Adesmia (plant)
Plants described in 1954